Roydon railway station is on the West Anglia Main Line serving the village of Roydon in Essex, England. Its three-letter station code is RYN.

The station and all trains serving it are operated by Greater Anglia.

History

The station was designed by Francis Thompson and opened by the Northern and Eastern Railway in 1844. The main station building was abandoned by British Railways in 1978 and remained unoccupied until being converted into a restaurant. The station was given Grade II listed status on 30 April 1971.

The station's signal box, built in 1876, is one of only two surviving examples of the GER Type I signal box.

In 2016 the station's ticket office was demolished, and a waiting room was built on its foundations. Additional customer information screens, ticket machines, and improved CCTV and lighting were added at the same time.

Services
All services at Roydon are operated by Greater Anglia using  EMUs.

The typical off-peak service in trains per hour is:
 1 tph to London Liverpool Street
 1 tph to 
 1 tph to 
 1 tph to 

On Sundays, the services between Stratford and Bishop's Stortford do not run.

References

External links

Grade II listed buildings in Essex
Railway stations in Essex
DfT Category E stations
Transport in Epping Forest District
Signal boxes in the United Kingdom
Former Great Eastern Railway stations
Greater Anglia franchise railway stations
Francis Thompson railway stations
Railway stations in Great Britain opened in 1844
1844 establishments in England
Roydon, Essex